The 2015 East Coast Bullbars Australian Rally Championship is the 48th season of the Australian Rally Championship. The season began on the 27th of March at the Quit Forest Rally in Nannup, Western Australia and will end at the Scouts Rally in South Australia. The championship consists of five events including the two international events of Rally Australia and the International Rally of Queensland. The championship is divided into outright (2WD), 4WD Rally Series and Classic Rally Challenge classes. 2014 champion Scott Pedder will not be returning to defend his title after entering into the WRC-2 Championship.

Calendar
The calendar has changed slightly from the 2014 season.

Teams and drivers

Outright ARC Teams

Teams and drivers competing in the outright (2WD) ARC championship

4WD Rally Series Teams

Teams and drivers competing in the 4WD ARC championship

Classic Rally Challenge Teams

Teams and drivers competing in the Classic ARC championship

Rally summaries

Round 1 — Quit Forest Rally

 Heat results 

 Power Stage results

Former champion Eli Evans began the season with a win at Quit Forest Rally after taking second in heat one and first in heat two. Molly Taylor made history becoming the first female driver to win a heat in the Australian Rally Championship taking heat one despite having to crawl through the final two stages with damaged steering. Four time champion Simon Evans marked his return to the championship with a win in the power stage and third overall with a third and second in heat one and two respectively. Former team mates Adrian Coppin and Tony Sullens both rolled out of the lead in their Citroen DS3 R3T's in heat one before the cars were repaired for heat two.

Round 2 — National Capital Rally

 Heat results

 Power Stage results

-->
Notes
  – Harry Bates was ineligible for championship points

Results and standings

Australian Rally Championship for Drivers

Points are awarded to the top twenty classified finishers. Bonus points are awarded to the top three in Power stage and winner of the most stages.

Australian Rally Championship for Co-drivers

Points are awarded to the top twenty classified finishers. Bonus points are awarded to the top three in Power stage and winner of the most stages.

Australian 4WD Rally Series for Drivers

Points are awarded to the top twenty classified finishers. Bonus points are awarded to the top three in Power stage and winner of the most stages. The best three events go towards final championship points.

Australian 4WD Rally Series for Co-drivers

Points are awarded to the top twenty classified finishers. Bonus points are awarded to the top three in Power stage and winner of the most stages. The best three events go towards final championship points.

Australian Classic Rally Challenge for Drivers

Points are awarded to the top twenty classified finishers. A bonus point is awarded winner of the most stages during an event. The best three events go towards final championship points.

Australian Classic Rally Challenge for Co-drivers

Points are awarded to the top twenty classified finishers. A bonus point is awarded winner of the most stages during an event. The best three events go towards final championship points.

References

External links
Official website

Rally competitions in Australia
Australian
Rally Championship